The Clapper is a sound-activated electrical switch, sold since 1984 by San Francisco, California based Joseph Enterprises, Inc. Joseph Pedott marketed the clapper with the slogan "Clap On! Clap Off! The Clapper!". 

The Clapper plugs into a U.S.-type electrical outlet, and allows control of up to two devices plugged into the Clapper.  An upgraded model, known as the Clapper Plus, includes a remote control function in addition to the original sound-based activation.

Although meant to activate by clapping, The Clapper can inadvertently be triggered by other noises.

Patent
The Clapper was invented by Carlile R. Stevens and Dale E. Reamer, and issued U.S. Patent #5493618, which was published on 20 February 1996.

References

Further reading

External links 

 Official site

Switches
Products introduced in 1984